The Nuovo soggettario is a subject indexing system managed and implemented by the National Central Library of Florence (Biblioteca nazionale centrale di Firenze, BNCF), that in Italy has the institutional task to curate and develop the subject indexing tools, as national book archive and as bibliographic production agency of the  Italian National Bibliography. It can be used in libraries, archives, media libraries, documentation centers and other institutes of the cultural heritage to index resources of various nature (texts, images, sounds, web sites, etc.) on various supports (analog, digital)

Components 
The Nuovo soggettario is a multy components system, whose principal ones are:

 A set of syntactic and semantic rules (published on the related Guide), aimed at processing the subject headings;
 The multi-disciplinary thesaurus in Italian language including the terminology that can be used in indexing and, in phase of research, by the users of online catalogues and other databases. The Nuovo Soggettario Thesaurus is available in open formats within the context of linked data.

Purposes 
The Nuovo soggettario suggests a method for subject indexing compliant with the international standards. It has renewed the Soggettario per i Cataloghi delle biblioteche italiane, published by BNCF in 1956 and used for many years by most Italian libraries.

History 

The project for the processing of the Nuovo soggettario was started by Antonia Ida Fontana (director of the National Central Library of Florence from 1996 to 2010) and has been supported, since the beginning, by the Ministry of Culture (Italy) and by the Istituto Centrale per il Catalogo Unico (ICCU).

It arose from the conviction that the Soggettario 1956  had become an old tool and that an in-depth revision had to be made necessary, also in view of developments that, in this context, have produced theories, international standards, conceptual models and indexing systems of other countries.

The project of Nuovo soggettario has unfolded through the main stages listed below: 
 2000-2002: Feasibility studies on the renewal of the Soggettario on behalf of a team of external consultants, coordinated by Luigi Crocetti and coming from an experience of the Gruppo di ricerca sull'indicizzazione per soggetto (GRIS). The study assessed and defined principles, characteristics and requirements of the new indexing language, by producing a set of recommendations to be developed in stages on a short-medium term plan.
 2003-2005: Assessment of the hypotheses identified for the new language, with an experimentation on specific ‘bibliographic cases’; start of the prototype stage and technological choices; drafting of the syntactic and semantic rules; arrangement of the prototype of the on-line Thesaurus.
 2007: Publication of the book Nuovo Soggettario. Guida al sistema italiano di indicizzazione per soggetto Prototipo delThesaurus, including the rules (both syntactic and semantic) [6] and of the interface of research for the online Thesaurus’ user.
 2007:  Publication of the online Thesaurus as a subscription service, with six-monthly updates. Beginning of the use of Nuovo Soggettario on behalf of the Italian National Bibliography and start of the development and of the terminological growth of the Thesaurus.
 2008: Beginning of the use of Nuovo soggettario on behalf of other Italian libraries.
 2010: Free accessibility to the Thesaurus online [7] and to the application Manual [8] in support of the indexers, periodically updated.
 2010: Prototype of translation of the Thesaurus metadata format in SKOS/RDF standard, also in the field of the linked data, and start of the interoperability with other knowledge organization systems available online.
 2011: Start of the interoperability with equivalents in English language of Library of Congress Subject Headings (LCSH).
 2011: Experimentation of the use of the Thesaurus in the automatic indexing of digital resources.
 2012: Start of the interoperability with equivalents in French language of Répertoire d’autorité-matière encyclopédique et alphabétique unifié (RAMEAU).
 2013: Start of the mutual interoperability between the Thesaurus and  Italian-language edition of Wikipedia.
 2016: Start of the interoperability between the Thesaurus and databases of archives and museums in terms of GLAM.
 2018: Start of the interoperability with equivalents in German language of Gemeinsame Normdatei (GND).
 2019: Start of the interoperability with equivalents in Spanish language of Encabezamientos de materia de la Biblioteca Nacional de España (EMBNE).
 2021: Publication of the 2nd fully revised and updated edition of the volume Nuovo soggettario. Guida al Sistema italiano di indicizzazione per soggetto.

Differences with the previous tool

Soggettario 
The Soggettario (edited in 1956) has been the result of the twenty-year work carried out by a group of librarians of the Florence National Library (coordinated, in its final stage, by Emanuele Casamassima ), starting with the headings of the subject catalogue of the Library and inspired by the American tradition of the Library of Congress Subject Headings (LCSH).

It involved a pre-coordinated type indexing, based on main entries and subdivisions; the subject headings could be constituted by both a single term present in the list and a combination of multiple terms (“subject strings”). It was in the form of a controlled vocabulary, with terms in alphabetical order, linked to other terms according to the meanings; it did not include an apparatus of explicit syntactic rules; the identified semantic relations did not meet a uniform and strict standard (not existing at that time).

The main principles of exhaustivity, specificity and coextension were not always accessible, although, basically, the tool satisfied the criteria of analysis and of group affiliation processed by Shiyali Ramamrita Ranganathan.

Over fifty years, the Subject indexing has been enhanced with the publication of Liste di aggiornamento (Update lists) until 1999, that are lists of new terms introduced by the Bibliografia nazionale italiana.

The tool, however, revealed all its inadequacy both in the most advanced disciplinary sectors and in the lexical and structural profile, without taking into account that the switching from paper catalogues to online public access catalogues (OPACs) had further emphasized its limits.

Nuovo soggettario 
The Nuovo soggettario pursues principles of specificity, exhaustivity and coextension. It involves explicit syntactic and semantic rules and is usable in pre-coordinated or post-coordinated mode. Inspired by the principles of analytical-synthetic systems, it is based on an interdisciplinary approach to the indexing while remaining ever attentive to the faceted classification methods.

The involved language is constituted by a detailed set of rules and by a multidisciplinary Thesaurus, as essential components of a structure that keeps the sphere of syntax apart from the terminological one. It complies with ISO standards with regard to the semantic indexing (related to both the conceptual analysis and the Thesauri), with the guidelines of the International Federation of Library Associations and Institutions (IFLA) and with other models that guarantee functional requirements in the bibliographic research (i.e., Functional Requirements for Bibliographic Records (FRBR), IFLA Library Reference Model (IFLA LRM)): thanks to these characteristics, it can communicate and be interoperable with other indexing tools.

The New subject indexing is part of the endeavor to develop even more the web search, in order to allow the connection between the Thesaurus and other types of vocabularies. Following the concept of an open towards non-book domains and in anticipation of an increasing integration between different archives, the Thesaurus, besides the Zthes and MARC21 standards, is also available in protocols and formats adequate to the data exchanges in the web, such as SKOS/RDF (first mapping in SKOS, see 0.1 of June 2010).

On this side, BNCF has both national and international ongoing collaborations and contacts, so as to optimize the methods of publication on the web – such as linked data – of the produced metadata. The metadata of the Thesaurus are available under the License Creative Commons, Attribution 4.0, that includes the free use, provided that its ownership be expressly recognized. 

The users of Thesaurus can interact with the working group of BNCF by filling in a dedicated form (to which one can access via a link marked by a sachet-shaped icon, appearing alongside each term), to send comments and suggestions on the term itself, its semantic reports, etc. in relation to the already existing terminology [10]. Instead, proposals for new terms are reserved to the institutions that have formally signed agreements with BNCF for the development of the Thesaurus.

Developments 
Updates and revisions of the Thesaurus are carried out by the Research and Tools for Subject Indexing and Classification of the BNCF (general coordination) with the collaboration of two more sectors of the BNCF: Italian national bibliography (BNI) and IT Services.

The Nuovo soggettario, that benefits from a wide net of collaborations with many kinds of institutions (university libraries, local institutions’ libraries, ecclesiastical libraries, etc., SBN nodes, important research and cultural institutions such as the Accademia della Crusca, CNR, the Istituto dell’Treccani, etc.), is more and more integrated with the structured data of Wikidata. In addition, the Thesaurus is gradually increasing its functionality on the front of multilingualism (thanks to the thousands of increasingly implemented equivalents) and has the goal of improving its own links with the metadata of archives and museums: an innovative initiative within the panorama of the subject indexing tools created by national libraries.

The Thesaurus of the Nuovo soggettario is constantly increasing; in March 2022, it has reached 69,400 terms from the 13,000 terms published in the prototype of January 2007. The increase of terms and equivalents in other languages is detected every six months and visible on the BNCF web site.

Footnotes

References 

 Biblioteca nazionale centrale di Firenze, Nuovo soggettario. Guida al sistema italiano di indicizzazione per soggetto, 2. ed. interamente rivista e aggiornata, Roma, Associazione italiana biblioteche, Firenze, Biblioteca nazionale centrale di Firenze, 2021.
 
 
 
 
 Atti della giornata di presentazione del Nuovo soggettario, Firenze, Salone dei Cinquecento in Palazzo Vecchio, 8 febbraio 2007, "Biblioteche oggi", 25 (2007), n. 6, p. 77-127. I testi degli interventi sono accessibili alla pagina e le slides sono consultabili in

External links 
 

Thesauri
Controlled vocabularies